Drissa Diarra may refer to:

Drissa Diarra (footballer, born 1985), Malian football midfielder
Drissa Diarra (footballer, born 1999), Malian football defender